Nigel Connor (born 14 October 1970) is an Anguillian football manager who manages Anguilla.

Career

Playing career

Connor started his playing career with Anguillian side Roaring Lions, helping them in the league.

Managerial career

Connor started his managerial career with Roaring Lions in Anguilla, helping them in the league. In 2018, he was appointed manager of Anguilla. In 2022, Connor was appointed manager of Anguilla for the second time.

References

External links

 

1970 births
Anguilla international footballers
Anguilla national football team managers
Anguillan football managers
Anguillan footballers
Association football defenders
Living people
Roaring Lions FC players